Salter may refer to:

Salter (surname)
Salter (trap)
Salter Brecknell, a manufacturer of light commercial weighing scales, part of Avery Weigh-Tronix
Salter Housewares, a manufacturer of consumer weighing scales
Salters Steamers, a boating company on the River Thames, England
Worshipful Company of Salters, a Livery Companiy of the City of London

See also
Psalter, a Book of Psalms
Drysalter, a dealer in chemical products